George Thomas Broadbridge, 1st Baron Broadbridge,  (13 February 1869 – 17 April 1952), was a British Conservative Party politician, most prominently in the City of London.

Broadbridge was sometime Alderman of the Candlewick Ward of the City and then Sheriff of the City of London from 1933 to 1934 and became Master of the Worshipful Company of Gardeners that year. He then became Lord Mayor of London in 1936 and on leaving that office a year later, was created a baronet.

He was elected unopposed as Member of Parliament (MP) for the City of London at a by-election in April 1938, and held the seat until September 1945 when he was raised to the peerage as Baron Broadbridge. On his death in 1952, he was succeeded in the title by his son Eric.

In 1933, he acquired a Queen Anne building, Lichfield House, in Richmond which he demolished and replaced by two blocks of flats, Lichfield Court, totalling 211 flats in all. These were built in the Art Deco style and are now Grade II listed.

Arms

References

External links 

Broadbridge, George Broadbridge, 1st Baron
Broadbridge, George Broadbridge, 1st Baron
Conservative Party (UK) MPs for English constituencies
Broadbridge, George Broadbridge, 1st Baron
Broadbridge, George Broadbridge, 1st Baron
Sheriffs of the City of London
Broadbridge, George Broadbridge, 1st Baron
Broadbridge, George Broadbridge, 1st Baron
UK MPs 1935–1945
UK MPs who were granted peerages
Councilmen and Aldermen of the City of London
Members of Parliament of the United Kingdom for the City of London
Fellows of the Royal Geographical Society
Barons created by George VI
George